The Blue Plate Building, is a building in the Gert Town section of New Orleans, Louisiana, at 1315 S. Norman C. Francis Parkway at the corner of Earhart Boulevard. It was listed on the National Register of Historic Places on October 16, 2008.  Its NRIS reference number is 08000989.

Built in 1941 in the Streamline Moderne style, it was originally a mayonnaise factory. It was designed by architect August Perez Jr in the art moderne style, a close cousin of art deco known for its curving forms, long horizontal lines and "streamlined" appearance. 

In 2012 it was redeveloped by HRI Properties into 72 loft-style apartments with a designed leasing preference for artists, and was renamed "Blue Plate Artists Lofts."

References

External links
 Blue Plate Mayo web site

Industrial buildings and structures on the National Register of Historic Places in Louisiana
Buildings and structures in New Orleans
Streamline Moderne architecture
National Register of Historic Places in New Orleans
Food processing industry in the United States